George Stuart Riley (November 18, 1922 – August 28, 2002) was a Canadian politician. He represented the electoral district of Halifax Cobequid in the Nova Scotia House of Assembly from 1970 to 1974. He was a member of the Nova Scotia Liberal Party.

Riley was born in Vancouver, British Columbia. A businessman, he attended Daniel Mclntyre Collegiate and the University of Manitoba in Winnipeg. In 1944, he married Margaret Jane Abraham.

Riley entered provincial politics in the 1970 election, defeating Progressive Conservative incumbent Gordon H. Fitzgerald by over 1000 votes in Halifax Cobequid. On November 24, 1971, Riley was appointed to the Executive Council of Nova Scotia as Minister of Public Works. He resigned from cabinet on May 16, 1972. Riley died on August 28, 2002, at QEII Health Sciences Centre in Halifax.

References

1922 births
2002 deaths
Businesspeople from Nova Scotia
Businesspeople from Vancouver
Nova Scotia Liberal Party MLAs
Members of the Executive Council of Nova Scotia
20th-century Canadian politicians
University of Manitoba alumni
Politicians from Vancouver
People from Sackville, Nova Scotia